Quevedo is a Spanish surname. Notable people with the surname include:

Carla Quevedo (born 1988), Argentine actress and designer
General Silvestre Quevedo Rico, a General in Chihuahua, Chihuahua Mexico 
Fernando Quevedo Rodríguez, a Guatemalan physicist
Fernando Quevedo Salazar, a Spanish racing cyclist
Francisco de Quevedo, a leading baroque poet of Spain's Siglo de Oro (Golden Century)
Gabriella Evelina Quevedo (born 1997), Swedish guitarist
Joaquim Amado Quevedo (1946–2022), Brazilian politician
José Quevedo, major in the Cuban army, fought Battle of La Plata during the Cuban Revolution
Juan de Quevedo, 16th-century Spanish Franciscan bishop and missionary
Leonardo Torres y Quevedo, Spanish engineer and mathematician, would be called "Torres"
El Mami Quevedo, Spanish footballer (soccer player)
Miguel Ángel de Quevedo, Mexican botanist
Nuria Quevedo (born 1938), Spanish-German painter
Orlando Quevedo, a Filipine Roman Catholic prelate
Óscar González-Quevedo (1930–2019), Spanish-Brazilian priest and investigator in parapsychology
Oswaldo Quevedo, Venezuelan Olympic swimmer
Pedro de Quevedo y Quintano
Raymond Quevedo, birth name of Trinidadian calypsonian "Attila the Hun"
Reynaldo Vera González-Quevedo (born 1961), Cuban chess grandmaster
Rubén Quevedo, Venezuelan baseball player
Samuel Alejandro Lafone Quevedo (1835–1920) an Argentinian archaeologist and author, son of Samuel Fisher Lafone

Spanish-language surnames